The Technical Chamber of Greece (TEE-TCG) is the Greek professional organization that serves as the official technical advisor of the Greek state and is responsible for awarding professional licences to all practicing engineers in Greece. It is a public legal entity with elected administration, supervised by the Hellenic Ministry of Environment, Physical Planning and Public Works. The Technical Chamber of Greece is a member of the European Council of Applied Sciences and Engineering.

It was founded in 1923 by the alumni of the National Technical University of Athens.

References

External links
  

Engineering societies based in Greece
1923 establishments in Greece